HellKat is a 2021 American horror film directed by Scott Jeffrey and Rebecca Matthew, starring Sarah T. Cohen, Ryan Davies, Abi Casson Thompson, Frances Katz and Ricardo Freitas.

Cast
 Sarah T. Cohen as Katrina 'HellKat' Bash
 Ryan Davies as Jimmy Scott
 Abi Casson Thompson as Salt
 Frances Katz as Zombee
 Ricardo Freitas as Freddy ‘Fish’ Bones
 Adrian Bouchet as The Barkeep
 Vaani K Sharma as Mrs. Grizz
 Michael Hoad as Furbluh
 Serhat Metin as Grizz
 Harvey McDonald as Jan Divine

Release
The film was released on digital platforms and to DVD on 2 February 2021.

Reception
Jacob Walker of Starburst rated the film 1 star out of 5 and wrote, "What could have been a low budget Mortal Kombat is a waste of concept and time." Dakota Dahl of Rue Morgue wrote that "The bar is low for good horror and martial arts crossovers, and HELLKAT, in its single impressive feat, manages to limbo right under it." Paul Grammatico of MovieWeb wrote that "While the story has some intrigue, it may have been too bold for the budget."

Phil Wheat of Nerdly wrote a positive review of the film.

References

External links
 
 

American horror films
2021 horror films